The Palomar Planet-Crossing Asteroid Survey (PCAS) was an astronomical survey, initiated by American astronomers Eleanor Helin and Eugene Shoemaker at the U.S Palomar Observatory, California, in 1973. The program is responsible for the discovery of 95 near-Earth Objects including 17 comets, while the Minor Planet Center directly credits PCAS with the discovery of 20 numbered minor planets during 1993–1994. PCAS ran for nearly 25 years until June 1995. It had an international extension, INAS, and was the immediate predecessor of the outstandingly successful NEAT program.

Notable discoveries 

The first NEO discovered by PACS was (5496) 1973 NA, an Apollo asteroid with an exceptional orbital inclination of 68°, the most highly inclined minor planet known until 1999. In 1976, Eleanor Helin discovered 2062 Aten, the first of a new class of asteroids called the Aten asteroids with small orbits that are never far from Earth's orbit. As a result, these objects have a particularly high probability of colliding with the Earth. In 1979, Helin discovered an Apollo-type asteroid, that they later identified with the comet 4015 Wilson–Harrington. It was the first confirmation that a comet can evolve into an asteroid after it has degassed.

List of discovered minor planets

See also 
 Brian P. Roman
 
 Spacewatch
List of near-Earth object observation projects

References

Publications 
 
 

1973 in science
Asteroid surveys
Astronomical surveys
Near-Earth Asteroid Tracking
Astronomical discoveries by institution